Qavaq-e Sofla (also Romanized as Qavāq-e Soflá; also known as Qarāq-e Pā’īn) is a village in Kolah Boz-e Gharbi Rural District, in the Central District of Meyaneh County, East Azerbaijan Province, Iran. At the 2006 census, its population was 180, in 32 families.

References 

Populated places in Meyaneh County